The Vaal Mall is a large shopping centre in Vanderbijlpark, Gauteng, South Africa.  It is the largest shopping centre in the region and serves patrons from Vanderbijlpark, Vereeniging, Sasolburg, Sebokeng, Bophelong and Parys.

The entire centre is built on one level with an extra 15 000sqm level added in (2014-2016) which contains a Ster-Kinekor with 7 movie cinemas, with one main passageway in the form of a winding river. Elements of the river theme can be found throughout the centre.

References

External links

Shopping centres in Gauteng
Shopping malls established in 2006
Emfuleni
21st-century architecture in South Africa